The Double Ninth Festival  (Chongyang Festival in Mainland China and Taiwan or Chung Yeung Festival in Hong Kong and Macau; ; Jungyangjeol (Hangul: ,), observed on the ninth day of the ninth month in the Chinese calendar, is a traditional Chinese holiday, mentioned in writings since before the Eastern Han period (before AD 25).

According to the I Ching, nine is a yang number; the ninth day of the ninth month in the Chinese calendar (or double nine) has too much yang (a traditional Chinese spiritual concept) and is thus a potentially very auspicious date. Hence, the day is also called "Double Yang Festival". It is customary to climb a high mountain, drink chrysanthemum liquor, and wear the zhuyu plant Cornus officinalis. (Both chrysanthemum and zhuyu are considered to have cleansing qualities and are used on other occasions to air out houses and cure illnesses.)

On this holiday, some Chinese also visit the graves of their ancestors to pay their respects. In Hong Kong and Macau, whole extended families head to ancestral graves to clean them and repaint inscriptions and lay out food offerings such as roast suckling pig and fruit, which are then eaten (after the spirits have consumed the spiritual element of the food). Chongyang cake is also popular. Incense sticks are burned. Cemeteries get crowded, and each year the burning incense sticks inadvertently start grass fires.

Origin
The origins of the festival date back as early as the Warring States period                                                      

In 1966, Taiwan rededicated the holiday as "Senior Citizens' Day", underscoring one custom as it is observed in Mainland China, where the festival is also an opportunity to care for and appreciate the elderly.

Double Ninth may have originated as a day to drive away danger, but like the Chinese New Year, over time, it became a day of celebration. In contemporary times it is an occasion for hiking and chrysanthemum appreciation. Other activities include flying kites, making flower cakes, and welcoming married daughters back home for visiting.

Stores sell rice cakes ( "gāo", a homophone for height ) with mini colorful flags to represent zhuyu. Most people drink chrysanthemum tea, while a few traditionalists drink homemade chrysanthemum wine. Children learn poems about chrysanthemums, and many localities host chrysanthemum exhibits. Mountain climbing races are also popular; winners get to wear a wreath made of zhuyu. In Shandong province, people drink spicy radish soup to bring good luck; it comes from an old saying, "Drink the radish soup, the whole family will not suffer".

Festivities

Japan
[[File:Karasu-zumo a.jpg|thumb|Karasu-zumo - lit. "crow sumo", part of the festivities held on September 9 at Kamigamo Shrine in Kyoto]]

It is most commonly celebrated on the 9th day of the 9th month according to the Gregorian calendar rather than the lunar calendar, i.e. on September 9. It is celebrated at both Shinto shrines and Buddhist temples. The festival is celebrated in the wish for the longevity of one's life and is observed by drinking chrysanthemum sake and eating dishes such as chestnut rice and chestnuts with glutinous rice.

Korea
In Korea, the festival is known as Jungyangjeol, and it is celebrated on the 9th day of the 9th month. Koreans would consume chrysanthemum leaves in pancakes. As the festival is meant to celebrate and cultivate good health, outdoor activities such as carrying dogwood, climbing hills or mountains for picnics, and gazing at chrysanthemum blossoms are carried out.

Gallery

See also
Double Seventh Festival
Qingming Festival, a day to visit and clean up the cemeteriesCurse of the Golden Flower'', a Chinese film in which the plot takes place around the Chrysanthemum Festival.

References

Autumn events in China
Autumn events in Japan
Festivals in Japan
Festivals in South Korea
October observances
Public holidays in China
Festivals established in 1966

Festivals in Taiwan
Observances honoring the dead
Observances set by the Chinese calendar